Love Remains the Same may refer to:

"Love Remains the Same" (song), a 2008 song by Gavin Rossdale
Love Remains the Same (album), an album by the Finnish rock band Von Hertzen Brothers